The Ukrainian Orthodox Church (Moscow Patriarchate) is an Eastern Orthodox religious body in Ukraine, with 251 monasteries and convents in its various dioceses.

Autonomous Republic of Crimea 
There are 22 monasteries one of them having a stauropegial status.

Dzhankoy Diocese 
Transfiguration Monastery

Feodosiya Diocese (2) 
Katerlez St. George's Convent
Kyzyltash St. Stephen of Sourozh's Monastery

Eparchy of Kyiv (1) 
St. Paisius Velichkovsky's stauropegial Monastery

Simferopol Diocese (18) 
Annunciation male metochion
Balaclava St. George's Monastery
Holy Dormition and St. Anastasia's Monastery
Holy Trinity Convent
Inkerman St. Clement's Monastery
Korsun Icon of the Mother of God female skete
Mangup Mountain Annunciation Monastery
Nativity of Christ male metochion
Protection of the Mother of God Monastery]
St. Anastasia the Great Martyr's male skete
St. Lazarus of Murom's Monastery
St. Luke the Apostle's Monastery
St. Nicholas's Monastery
St. Sabbas the Sanctifieds's Monastery
St. Theodore Stratelates the Great Martyr's Monastery
Sts. Cosma and Damian's Monastery
Toplovskiy St. Parasceva's Convent
Transfiguration male skete

Cherkasy Region 
There are 11 monasteries.

Cherkasy Diocese 
Chyhyryn Holy Trinity Convent
Krasnohirskiy Protection of the Mother of God Convent
Lebedyn St. Nicholas's Convent
Matrona's Holy Trinity Convent
Nativity of the Most Holy Mother of God Monastery
St. Alexis the Man of God's Monastery
St. Onuphrius's Monastery
Transfiguration Convent

Uman Diocese 
"Hegumenness of Holy Mt. Athos" Icon of the Mother of God Convent
St. George's Convent
St. Panteleimon's Convent

Chernihiv Region 
There are 12 monasteries.

Chernigiv Diocese 
Danivka St. George's Convent
Domnytsya Nativity of the Most Holy Mother of God Monastery
Novhorod-Siverskyy Transfiguration Monastery
St. Lawrence of Chernihiv's Convent
Yeletskiy Holy Dormition Convent

Nizhyn Diocese 
"Healer" Icon of the Mother of God female metochion
Annunciation Monastery
Entry of the Mother of God Convent
Hustynya Holy Trinity Convent
Krupytsky St. Nicholas's Convent
Meeting Of the Lord female metochion
Rykhly Desert St. Nicholas's Monastery

Chernivtsi Region

Chernivtsi and Bukovina Diocese 
"Gorecha" Nativity of the Most Holy Mother of God Monastery
Boyany Icon of the Mother of God Convent
Buncheny Ascension Monastery
Entry of the Mother of God Convent
Kolinkivtsi St. Vladimir's Monastery]
Kulivtsi Holy Dormition Monastery
Myrrh-bearers’ Convent
Neporotovo St. Nicholas's Monastery
Protection of the Mother of God Convent
St. Anne's Convent
St. Athanasius the Athonite's Convent
St. John of Sochava's Convent
St. John the Theologian's Monastery
St. Panteleimon's male metochion
St. Seraphim's Monastery

Dnipropetrivsk Region

Dnipropetrovsk Diocese 
"Holy Sign" Icon of the Mother of God Convent
Ascension Convent
Holy Trinity Desert Monastery
Samara St. Nicholas's Monastery]
Tikhvin Convent

Kamianske Diocese 
Protection of the Mother of God Convent
St. Joseph's Convent

Eparchy of Kryvyi Rih 
Protection of the Mother of God Convent
St. Vladimir the Priest-Martyr's Monastery

Donetsk Region

Donetsk Diocese 
"Joy of All Who Sorrows" Icon of the Mother of God female skete
All Saints' male skete
Holy Dormition female skete
Iberian Icon of the Mother of God Convent
Kasperivska Icon of the Mother of God Convent
St. Basil's Monastery
St. George's male skete
St. John of Shanghai's male skete
St. Nicholas's Convent
Sts. Antony and Theodosius of the Caves' male skete
Svyatohirsk Holy Dormition Lavra
Turkowice Icon of the Mother of God female skete]

Horlivka Diocese 
Protection Mother of God female skete
St. Sergius of Radonezh's Convent
St. Stephen's Convent]

Ivano-Frankivsk Region

Ivano-Frankivsk Diocese 
Dukonya Holy Trinity Monastery
Protection of the Mother of God Convent
Uhornyky St. Michael the Archangel's Monastery]

Kharkiv Region

Izium Diocese 
Nativity of St. John the Forerunner male skete
Pisky Icon of the Mother of God Monastery
Sts. Boris and Gleb's Convent

Kharkiv Diocese 
Protection of the Mother of God Monastery
St. Michael the Archangel's Convent

Kherson Region

Kherson Diocese 
Annunciation Convent
Protection of the Mother of God Monastery
St. Nicholas's female skete

Nova Kakhovka Diocese 
Bizyukiv St. Gregory's Monastery
Korsun Icon of the Mother of God Convent

Khmelnytskyy Region

Kamianets-Podilskyi Diocese 
Holy Trinity Convent

Khmelnytskyi Diocese 
"Life-Bearing Well" Icon of the Mother of God Convent
Exaltation of Cross Monastery
St. John the Forerunner's Monastery
St. Michael the Archangel's female skete
Transfiguration Convent

Shepetivka Diocese 
Horodyshche Nativity of the Most Holy Mother of God Monastery
St. Alexander Nevsky's Convent
St. Anne's Convent

Kirovohrad Region

Kropyvnytskyi Diocese 
St. Elizabeth's Monastery

Oleksandriya Diocese 
Protection of the Mother of God Monastery
Theophany Convent

Kyiv Region

Bila Tserkva Diocese 
Rzhyshchiv Transfiguration Monastery
St. Barbara the Great Martyr's Convent
St. Mary Magdalene the-Equal-to-the-Apostles' Convent
St. Seraphim's Monastery
Sts. Regal Martyrs' Convent

Boryspil Diocese 
"Life-Bearing Well" Icon of the Mother of God Monastery
Ascension Monastery
Holy Dormition Convent
St. Michael the Archangel's Monastery
Transfiguration Monastery

Kyiv Diocese 
"Comfort and Consolation" Icon of the Mother of God Convent
"Kyiv Brotherhood" Icon of the Mother of God Convent
"Listener" Icon of the Mother of God Convent
Annunciation Monastery
Deposition of Robe of the Mother of God in Blachernae Monastery
Flor’s Ascension Convent
Holosiyive Protection of the Mother of God Monastery
Holy Trinity and St. Jonah's Monastery
Kytayeve Holy Trinity Monastery
Kyiv Entry of the Mother of God Monastery
Kyiv Holy Dormition Caves Lavra
Nativity of the Most Holy Mother of God in Tserkovshchina Tract Monastery
Protection of the Mother of God Convent
St. Alexander of Rome the Martyr's male skete
St. Cyril's Monastery
St. Michael's stauropegial male metochion
St. Nicholas's female skete
St. Olga the-Equal-to-the-Apostles' Convent
St. Panteleimon's Convent
Tikhvin St. Nicholas's Convent
Tithe Nativity of the Most Holy Mother of God Monastery
Transfiguration Monastery
Transfiguration Convent
Ven. Anastasia of Kyiv's Convent
Zvirynets St. Michael the Archangel's Monastery

Luhansk Region

Donetsk Diocese 
St. Theodosius of Chernihiv's male skete

Luhansk Diocese 
Ascension Monastery
Iberian Icon of the Mother of God female community]
Nativity of the Most Holy Mother of God Conven
St. John the Forerunner's Monastery
St. Olga the Regal Martyr's Convent

Rovenky Diocese 
St. Andrew's Monastery

Severodonetsk Diocese 
St. Elijah's Monastery
St. Sergius of Radonezh's Monastery
Starobilsk "Joy of All Who Sorrows" Icon of the Mother of God Convent

Lviv Region

Lviv Diocese 
St. Onuphrius's Monastery]
Transfiguration Convent

Mykolayiv Region

Mykolaiv Diocese 
Pelahiyivka St. Michael the Archangel's Convent
Sts. Constantine and Helen's Monastery

Odesa Region

Balta Diocese 
"Joy of All Who Sorrows" Icon of the Mother of God Convent
Protection of the Mother of God and Balta St. Theodosius Monastery

Odesa Diocese 
"Pantanassa" Icon of the Mother of God male skete
Ascension female skete
Borysivka Transfiguration Convent
Iberian Icon of the Mother of God Monastery
Nativity of Christ male skete
Nativity of the Most Holy Mother of God Convent
Nativity of the Most Holy Mother of God female skete
Odesa Holy Dormition Monastery
Protection of the Mother of God male skete
St. Elijah's Monastery
St. John the Forerunner's male skete
St. Michael the Archangel's Convent
St. Nicholas's Monastery
St. Panteleimon's Monastery
Sts. Constantine and Helen's Monastery]
Teplodar Resurrection Convent

Poltava Region

Kremenchuk Diocese 
Kozelshchyna Nativity of the Most Holy Mother of God Convent
Pototsky Sts. Antony and Theodosius's Monastery

Poltava Diocese 
Exaltation of Cross Convent
Mhar Transfiguration Monastery
Velyki Budyshcha Holy Trinity Convent

Rivne Region

Moscow Diocese 
Korets Holy Trinity Stauropegial Convent

Rivne Diocese 
Annunciation Convent
Ascension female skete
Derman Holy Trinity Convent
Horodok St. Nicholas's Convent
Hoshcha Protection of the Mother of God Convent
Holy Dormition Monastery
Iberian Icon of the Mother of God Convent]
Mezhyrich Holy Trinity Monastery
Myrrh-bearers’ female skete
Nativity of the Most Holy Mother of God Convent
St. Anne's female skete
St. Barbara the Great Martyr's male skete
St. George's female metochion
The Synaxis of Twelve Apostles female skete

Sarny Diocese 
"Life-Bearing Well" Icon of the Mother of God Monastery
Iberian Icon of the Mother of God Convent
Protection of the Mother of God Monastery]
Protection of the Mother of God Monastery
Volyn Icon of the Mother of God Convent]

Sumy Region

Kyiv Diocese 
Nativity of the Most Holy Mother of God Glinskaya Pustyn stauropegial Monastery

Konotop Diocese 
Molchansky Caves Nativity of the Most Holy Mother of God Convent
Sofronievo-Molchansky Nativity of the Mother of God Monastery
St. Charalampias the Priest-Martyr's Convent
St. Nicholas's female metochion

Sumy Diocese 
Okhtyrka Holy Trinity Monastery

Ternopil Region

Kyiv Diocese 
Pochayiv Holy Dormition Lavra

Ternopil Diocese 
Kremenets Theophany Convent
Pochayiv Holy Spirit Monastery
Zahaytsi St. John the Almoner's Monastery

Vinnytsa Region

Kyiv Diocese 
Holy Trinity Stauropegial Convent
Pochayiv Icon of the Mother of God stauropegial female skete

Mohyliv-Podilskyi Diocese 
Beheading of St. John 's Monastery
St. Nicholas's Monastery
Transfiguration Monastery
Holy Dormition Monastery
St. Michael the Archangel's Convent
Bar Icon of the Mother of God Convent
Brayiliv Holy Trinity Convent
Lemeshivka St. John the Theologian's Monastery

Volyn Region

Kyiv Diocese (2) 

St. Alexander Nevsky's stauropegial Convent
Zymne Svytohirsky Holy Dormition stauropegial Convent

Volodymyr-Volynsk Diocese 
Myltsi St. Nicholas's Monastery
Nyzkynychi Holy Dormition Monastery
St. John the Forerunner's male skete
Svityaz Sts. Peter and Paul's Monastery

Volyn Diocese 
Exaltation of Cross Monastery
Mikhnivka Meeting of the Lord Convent
Starosilye Holy Trinity Convent

Zakarpattya Region

Khust Diocese 
"Unexpected Joy" Icon of the Mother of God Monastery
Ascension Convent
Holy Trinity Convent
Holy Trinity Monastery
Hrusheve St. Michael the Archangel's Monastery
Nativity of the Most Holy Mother of God Convent
Protection of the Mother of God male skete]
St. Elijah's Monastery
St. Elijah's male skete
St. George's Monastery
St. John the Forerunner's Monastery (Bedevlya)
St. John the Forerunner's Monastery (Roztoky)
St. John the Theologian's Convent
St. Michael the Archangel's Convent
St. Nicholas's Monastery
St. Panteleimon's Monastery
St. Panteleimon's female skete
St. Seraphim's Convent
St. Sergius of Radonezh's Convent
St. Simeon's Monastery
St. Stephen's Monastery
Transfiguration Monastery
Uhlya Holy Dormition Convent

Mukachevo Diocese 
Entry of the Mother of God Convent
Holy Dormition Convent
Holy Dormition Monastery
Kazan Icon of the Mother of God Monastery
Krasnohirskiy All Saints' Monastery
Mukachevo St. Nicholas's Convent
Pochayiv Icon of the Mother of God Monastery
Protection of the Mother of God Monastery
Protection of the Mother of God male skete
Protection of the Mother of God Monastery
Resurrection Monastery
St. George's Monastery]
St. John the Forerunner's Convent
St. John the Theologian's Monastery
St. Mary Magdalene the-Equal-to-the-Apostles's Convent
St. Panteleimon's Monastery
St. Seraphim's Convent
St. Vladimir the-Equal-to-the-Apostles' Monastery
Sts. Cyril and Methodius's Convent

Zaporizhia Region

Berdyansk Diocese 
Holy Dormition Convent
St. Ambrose of Optina's Monastery
St. Michael the Archangel's Convent
St. Seraphim's Convent

Zaporizhia Diocese 
St. Elizabeth's Convent
St. John the Theologian's Convent
St. Nicholas's Convent
St. Sabbas the Sanctified's Monastery
Tikhvin Icon of the Mother of God female skete

Zhytomyr Region

Kyiv Diocese 
"Assuage My Sorrows" Icon of the Mother of God stauropegial Convent
Athos Icon of the Mother of God stauropegial Convent
Horodnytsya St. George's stauropegial Monastery
Iberian Icon of the Mother of God stauropegial female skete]
St. John the Russian's stauropegial male metochion
St. Silvanus the Athonite's stauropegial male skete
Zhytomyr St. Anastasia of Rome's stauropegial Convent

Ovruch Diocese 
Kazan Icon of the Mother of God Monastery
St. Basil's Convent

Zhytomyr Diocese 
Chervone Nativity of Christ Convent
Holy Mandylion Protection Convent
Tryhirya Transfiguration Monastery

Sub-list of stauropegial monasteries
Korets Holy Trinity Stauropegial Convent, belongs directly to the Russian Orthodox Church

St. Paisius Velichkovsky's stauropegial Monastery (Autonomous Republic of Crimea)
Nativity of the Most Holy Mother of God Glinskaya Pustyn stauropegial Monastery (Sumy Oblast)
Pochayiv Holy Dormition Lavra (Ternopil Oblast)
Holy Trinity Stauropegial Convent (Vinnytsia Oblast)
Pochayiv Icon of the Mother of God stauropegial female skete (Vinnytsia Oblast)
St. Alexander Nevsky's stauropegial Convent (Volyn Oblast)
Zymne Svytohirsky Holy Dormition stauropegial Convent (Volyn Oblast)
"Assuage My Sorrows" Icon of the Mother of God stauropegial Convent (Zhytomyr Oblast)
Athos Icon of the Mother of God stauropegial Convent (Zhytomyr Oblast)
Horodnytsya St. George's stauropegial Monastery (Zhytomyr Oblast)
Iberian Icon of the Mother of God stauropegial female skete] (Zhytomyr Oblast)
St. John the Russian's stauropegial male metochion (Zhytomyr Oblast)
St. Silvanus the Athonite's stauropegial male skete (Zhytomyr Oblast)
Zhytomyr St. Anastasia of Rome's stauropegial Convent (Zhytomyr Oblast)

Statistics

Monasteries by region
 Zakarpattia Oblast – 42
 Kyiv and Kyiv Oblast – 25
 Autonomous Republic of Crimea – 22
 Rivne Oblast – 20
 Odesa Oblast – 18
 Chernivtsi Oblast – 15
 Donetsk Oblast – 15
 Chernihiv Oblast – 12
 Zhytomyr Oblast – 12
 Cherkasy Oblast – 11
 Luhansk Oblast – 10
 Vinnytsia Oblast – 10
 Dnipropetrovsk Oblast – 9
 Khmelnytskyi Oblast – 9
 Volyn Oblast – 9
 Zaporizhia Oblast – 9
 Sumy Oblast – 6
 Kharkiv Oblast – 5
 Kherson Oblast – 5
 Poltava Oblast – 5
 Ternopil Oblast – 4
 Ivano-Frankivsk Oblast – 3
 Kirovohrad Oblast – 3
 Lviv Oblast – 2
 Mykolaiv Oblast – 2

Monasteries by eparchy (diocese)
 Kyiv – 39 (Kyiv–25, ARC–1, Sumy–1, Ternopil–1, Vinnytsia–2, Volyn–2, Zhytomyr–7)
 Khust – 23 (Zakarpattia)
 Mukachevo – 19 (Zakarpattia)
 Simferopol – 18 (ARC)
 Odesa – 16 (Odesa)
 Bukovina – 15 (Chernivtsi)
 Rivne – 14 (Rivne)
 Donetsk – 13 (Donetsk–12, Luhansk–1)
 Cherkasy – 8 (Cherkasy)
 Mohyliv-Podilskyi – 8 (Vinnytsia)
 Nizhyn – 7 (Chernihiv)
 Chernihiv – 5 (Chernihiv)
 Dnipro – 5 (Dnipropetrovsk)
 Khmelnytskyi – 5 (Khmelnytskyi)
 Bila Tserkva – 5 (Kyiv)
 Boryspil – 5 (Kyiv)
 Luhansk – 5 (Luhansk)
 Sarny – 5 (Rivne)
 Zaporizhia – 5 (Zaporizhia)
 Konotop – 4 (Sumy)
 Volodymyr-Volynskyi – 4 (Volyn)
 Berdiansk – 4 (Zaporizhia)
 Uman – 3 (Cherkasy)
 Horlivka – 3 (Donetsk)
 Ivano-Frankivsk – 3 (Ivano-Frankivsk)
 Izium – 3 (Kharkiv)
 Kherson – 3 (Kherson)
 Shepetivka – 3 (Khmelnytskyi)
 Severodonetsk – 3 (Luhansk)
 Poltava – 3 (Poltava)
 Ternopil – 3 (Ternopil)
 Volyn – 3 (Volyn)
 Zhytomyr – 3 (Zhytomyr)
 Feodosiya – 2 (ARC)
 Kamianske – 2 (Dnipropetrovsk)
 Kryvyi Rih – 2 (Dnipropetrovsk)
 Kharkiv – 2 (Kharkiv)
 Nova Kakhovka – 2 (Kherson)
 Oleksandriya – 2 (Kirovohrad)
 Lviv – 2 (Lviv)
 Mykolaiv – 2 (Mykolaiv)
 Balta – 2 (Odesa)
 Kremenchuk – 2 (Poltava)
 Ovruch – 2 (Zhytomyr)
 Dzhankoy – 1 (ARC)
 Kamianets-Podilskyi – 1 (Khmelnytskyi)
 Kropyvnytskyi – 1 (Kirovohrad)
 Rovenky – 1 (Luhansk)
 Sumy – 1 (Sumy)
 Moscow – 1 (Russian Orthodox Church)

References 
 Monasteries Search — UOC Synod Commission for Monasteries
 Map of Monasteries — UOC Synod Commission for Monasteries

Eastern Orthodox monasteries in Ukraine
Monasteries, Orthodox
Monasteries, Ukraine
Ukrainian orthodox